Mister Ed is a U.S. fantasy sitcom that was produced by Filmways. It first aired in syndication from January 5 to July 2, 1961 and then on CBS from October 1, 1961 to February 6, 1966, producing 143 black-and-white episodes over six seasons. The December 10, 1961 episode was pre-empted by the 1961 telecast of the film The Wizard of Oz.

All six seasons of Mister Ed are currently available on DVD in the U.S.

Note: The episodes are listed in order of production writing and completion;  they often do not necessarily fall in line with the date of original airing.

Series overview

Episodes

Season 1 (1961)

Season 2 (1961–62)

Season 3 (1962–63)

Season 4 (1963–64)

Season 5 (1964–65)

Season 6 (1965–66)

References 

General references

External links 
 

Lists of American sitcom episodes